Maula Bakhsh Chandio, is a Pakistani politician who served as the Federal Minister for Law. He is also a member of the Senate of Pakistan.

Early life
He born on 16 April 1944 in Hyderabad and belongs to Chandio Baloch family. Recently he wrote his biography Galiyaan Yad Nagar ki which was launched by Sindh Governor Dr. Ishratul Ibad Khan at Karachi Press Club.

Career 
He was selected as information adviser to CM Sindh.

He was elected as Senator in 2009 by PPP-P. In April 2011 he became Federal Minister for Law, Justice, and Parliamentary Affairs, where he contributed 18th Amendment in the Constitution of Pakistan. In April 2012 his portfolio was changed to Federal Minister of Parliamentary and Political Affairs. On 27 July 2012 he became Senior Vice President of PPP-P Sindh. He is considered as the ideological intellects of the party and holds a soft image among both the coalition partners and opposition.

References 

Living people
Baloch politicians
Members of the Senate of Pakistan
Pakistan People's Party politicians
People from Hyderabad District, Pakistan
1944 births